Doble may refer to:

People named Doble
 Abner Doble, proprietor of the Doble Steam Motor Corporation
 Rev. Gilbert Hunter Doble, hagiographer of Cornish Saints
 Sam Doble, rugby union full back

Other 
 Doble, Poland
 Doble Steam Car, produced by Abner Doble
 Paso Doble, a style of dance
 Doble baston, a form of martial art, using two sticks
 Smeargle, a Pokémon species named "Doble" in original Japanese language versions